USS Connole (FF-1056) was a , named for Commander David R. Connole, Captain of  when the submarine was lost in battle in March 1945.

Design and description
The Knox-class design was derived from the  modified to extend range and without a long-range missile system. They displaced  at full load. Their crew consisted of 13 officers and 211 enlisted men.

The ships were equipped with one Westinghouse geared steam turbine that drove the single propeller shaft.

The Knox-class ships were armed with a 5"/54 caliber Mark 42 gun forward and a single 3-inch/50-caliber gun aft. They mounted an eight-round ASROC launcher between the 5-inch (127 mm) gun and the bridge. Close-range anti-submarine defense was provided by two twin  Mk 32 torpedo tubes. The ships were equipped with a torpedo-carrying DASH drone helicopter; its telescoping hangar and landing pad were positioned amidships aft of the mack. Beginning in the 1970s, the DASH was replaced by a SH-2 Seasprite LAMPS I helicopter and the hangar and landing deck were accordingly enlarged. Most ships also had the 3-inch (76 mm) gun replaced by an eight-cell BPDMS missile launcher in the early 1970s.

Construction and career 
Connole was constructed for the United States Navy by Avondale Shipyard, Westwego, Louisiana, laid down 23 March 1967, launched 20 July 1968 and delivered 22 August 1969. She was commissioned 30 August 1969, served as a test bed for some of the Navy's most advanced sonars, decommissioned 30 August 1992 and struck 11 January 1995. Connole was transferred to Greece as Ipiros (F456), named after the region of Epirus. The ship was decommissioned by Greece in 2003.

Notes

References 

Navsource images
Ipiros page

External links
Navysite.de

 

Knox-class frigates
Ships built in Bridge City, Louisiana
1968 ships
Cold War frigates and destroyer escorts of the United States
Knox-class frigates of the Hellenic Navy
Ships sunk as targets